The history of El Salvador begins with several Mesoamerican nations, especially the Cuzcatlecs, as well as the Lenca and Maya. In the early 16th century, the Spanish Empire conquered the territory, incorporating it into the Viceroyalty of New Spain ruled from Mexico City. In 1821, El Salvador achieved independence from Spain as part of the First Mexican Empire, only to further secede as part of the Federal Republic of Central America two years later. Upon the republic's isolation  in 1841, El Salvador became sovereign until forming a short-lived union with Honduras and Nicaragua called the Greater Republic of Central America, which lasted from 1895 to 1898.

In the 20th century, El Salvador had endured chronic political and economic instability characterized by coups, revolts, and a succession of authoritarian rulers caused by the intervention of the United States. Persistent socioeconomic inequality and civil unrest culminated in the devastating Salvadoran Civil War in the 1980s, which was fought between the military-led government and a coalition of left-wing guerrilla groups. The conflict ended in 1992 with a negotiated settlement that established a multiparty constitutional republic, which remains in place to this day.

El Salvador's economy was historically dominated by agriculture, beginning with the indigo plant (añil in Spanish), the most important crop during the colonial period, and followed thereafter by coffee, which by the early 20th century accounted for 90 percent of export earnings.

Before the Spanish conquest

Before the Spanish conquest, the area that is known as El Salvador was composed of three indigenous states and several principalities. In central El Salvador were the indigenous inhabitants, the Pipils, or the Pipiles, a tribe of the nomadic people of Nahua that were settled there for a long time.
"The Pipil were a determined people who stoutly resisted Spanish efforts to extend their dominion southward."

The region of the east was populated and then governed by the Lencas. The North zone of the Lempa High River was populated and governed by the Chortis, a Mayan people. Their culture was similar to that of their Aztec and Maya neighbors.

"Several notable archaeological sites contain dwellings and other evidence of daily life 1400 years ago; these were found preserved beneath 6 m (20 ft) of volcanic ash."

Spanish conquest (1524–1525)

The first Spanish attempt to control El Señorío of Cuzcatlán, or The Lordship of Cuzcatlan, failed in 1524, when Pedro de Alvarado was forced to retreat by Pipil warriors led by King Atlácatl and Prince Atonal in the Battle of Acajuctla. In 1525, he returned and succeeded in bringing the district under control of the Audiencia of Mexico.

Spanish rule (1525–1609) 

Pedro de Alvarado named the area for Jesus Christ – El Salvador ("The Savior"). He was appointed its first governor, a position he held until his death in 1541. The area was under the authority of a short-lived Audiencia of Panama from 1538 to 1543, when most of Central America was placed under a new Audiencia of Guatemala.

Independence (1821)
 
In the early 19th century, Napoleon's occupation of Spain led to the outbreak of revolts all across Spanish America. In New Spain, all of the fighting by those seeking independence was done in the center of that area from 1810 to 1821, what today is central Mexico. Once the Viceroy was defeated in the capital city –today Mexico City- in 1821, the news of the independence were sent to all the territories of New Spain including the indecencies of the former Captaincy of Guatemala.

The public proclamation was done through the Act of Independence in 1821. After the declaration of independence it was the intention of the New Spain parliament to establish a commonwealth whereby the King of Spain, Ferdinand VII, would also be Emperor of New Spain, but in which both countries were to be governed by separate laws and with their own legislative offices. Should the king refuse the position, the law provided for a member of the House of Bourbon to accede to the New Spain throne. Ferdinand VII, however, did not recognize the independence and said that Spain would not allow any other European prince to take the throne of New Spain.

By request of Parliament, the president of the regency Agustín de Iturbide was proclaimed emperor of New Spain but the Parliament also decided to rename New Spain as Mexico. The Mexican Empire was the official name given to this monarchical regime from 1821 to 1823. The territory of the Mexican Empire included the continental intendencies and provinces of New Spain proper (including those of the former Captaincy General of Guatemala).

El Salvador, fearing incorporation into Mexico, petitioned the United States government for statehood. But in 1823, a revolution in Mexico ousted Emperor Agustín de Iturbide, and a new Mexican congress voted to allow the Central American Intendencies to decide their own fate. That year, the United Provinces of Central America was formed of the five Central American Intendencies under General Manuel José Arce. The Intendencies took the new name of States.

In 1832, Anastasio Aquino led an indigenous revolt against Criollos and Mestizos in Santiago Nonualco, a small town in the province of La Paz. The source of the discontent of the indigenous people was the constant abuse and the lack of land to cultivate. The problem of land distribution has been the source of many political conflicts in Salvadoran history.

The Central American federation was dissolved in 1838 and El Salvador became an independent republic.

From Indigo to Coffee: Displacement

El Salvador's landed elite depended on production of a single export crop, indigo. This led the elite to be attracted to certain lands while leaving other lands, especially those around former volcanic eruptions, to the poor subsistence farming and the Indian communes. In the middle of the 19th century, however, indigo was replaced by chemical dyes. The landed elite replaced this crop with a newly demanded product, coffee.

The lands that had once been dependent for the product (indigo) were suddenly quite valuable. The elite-controlled legislature and president passed vagrancy laws that removed people from their land and the great majority of Salvadorans became landless. Their former lands were absorbed into the coffee plantations (fincas).

Héctor Lindo-Fuentes' book, titled Weak Foundations: The Economy of El Salvador in the Nineteenth Century, asserts that "the parallel process of state-building and expansion of the coffee industry resulted in the formation of an oligarchy that was to rule El Salvador during the twentieth century."

The oligarchy 
The oligarchy that have controlled El Salvador's history were all but feudal lords. Although the constitution was amended repeatedly in favor of the feudal lords (in 1855, 1864, 1871, 1872, 1880, 1883, and 1886), several elements remained constant throughout.

The wealthy landowners were granted super-majority power in the national legislature and economy (for example, the 1824 constitution provided for a unicameral legislature of 70 deputies, in which 42 seats were set aside for the landowners). The president, selected from the landed elite, was also granted significant power throughout. Each of El Salvador's 14 regional departments had a governor appointed by the president. The rapid changes in the constitution are mainly due to the attempts of various presidents to hold onto power. (For example, President Gerardo Barrios created a new constitution to extend his term limit.)

Coffee gave birth to the oligarchy in the late 19th century, and economic growth has revolved around them ever since.

The Fourteen Families "las catorce familias" is a reference to the oligarchy which controlled most of the land and wealth in El Salvador during the 19th and 20th centuries with names including de Sola, Llach, Hill, Meza-Ayau, Duenas, Dalton, Regalado, Quiñonez, and Salaverria.

In the last 35 years, the men of economic power in El Salvador have transformed themselves: landowning agricultural exporters converted into powerful investors.

The riches of El Salvador have been reconcentrated in a few hands, an event without precedent in the history of this country or the Central American region. From the 14 oligarchic families of the past century, now capital is distributed among 8 powerful business groups.

Before the commencement of the civil war in 1980, the Salvadoran economy revolved around three agricultural products: coffee (which was pre-eminent), sugar cane, and cotton. These defined the life of this small country that had a population of no more than 3 million inhabitants.

Eight business conglomerates now dominate economic life in El Salvador and they are largely owned by the descendants of the original 14 families of the coffee oligarchy. Those 8 business groups are: Grupo Cuscatlán, Banagrícola, Banco Salvadoreño, Banco de Comercio, Grupo Agrisal, Grupo Poma, Grupo de Sola, and Grupo Hill.

Military dictatorships (1931–1979)

 Between 1931, the year of Gen. Maximiliano Hernández Martínez's coup, and 1944, when he was deposed, there was brutal suppression of rural resistance. The most notable event was the 1932 Salvadoran peasant uprising headed by  Farabundo Martí, Chief Feliciano Ama from the Izalco tribe and Chief Francisco "Chico" Sanchez from Juayua, Izalco subdivision. The government retaliation, commonly referred to as La Matanza (the 'slaughter'), which followed after the days of protest. In this 'Matanza', between 10,000 and 40,000 indigenous people and political opponents were murdered, imprisoned or exiled. Until 1980, all but one Salvadoran temporary president was an army officer. Periodic presidential elections were seldom free or fair.

El Salvador, from 1931 to 1979, was ruled by the military and its economy was based on the monoculture of coffee, which denotes the submission of the peasant to a production system imposed by the corvo and the rifle, so there was no way or more logical sense of expression before the bosses or foremen for someone who was subjected to the line shops and working conditions close to slavery. For this reason it is considered by historians as an allegorical example of the great destruction to the fulfillment of Human Rights at that time.

From the 1930s to the 1970s, authoritarian governments employed political repression and limited reform to maintain power, despite the trappings of democracy. The National Conciliation Party was in power from the early 1960s until 1979. Gen. Fidel Sánchez Hernández was president from 1967 to 1972, Col Arturo A. Molina from 1972 to 1977, and the last one was Gen Carlos Humberto Romero from 1977 to 1979.

During the 1970s, there was great political instability. In the 1972 presidential election, opponents of military rule united under José Napoleón Duarte, leader of the Christian Democratic Party (PDC). Amid widespread fraud, Duarte's broad-based reform movement was defeated. Subsequent protests and an attempted coup were crushed and Duarte exiled. These events eroded hope of reform through democratic means and persuaded those opposed to the government that armed insurrection was the only way to achieve change.

Salvadoran Civil War (1980–1992)

In 1979 the reformist Revolutionary Government Junta took power. Both the extreme right and the left now disagreed with the government and increased political violence quickly turned into a civil war. The initially poorly trained Salvadoran Armed Forces (ESAF) also engaged in repression and indiscriminate killings, the most notorious of which was the [[El 981. The United States supported the government, and Cuba and other Communist states supported the insurgents now organized as the Farabundo Martí National Liberation Front (FMLN). The Chapultepec Peace Accords marked the end of the war in 1992, and FMLN became one of the major political parties.

In accordance with the peace agreements, the constitution was amended to prohibit the military from playing an internal security role except under extraordinary circumstances. Demobilization of Salvadoran military forces generally proceeded on schedule throughout the process. The Treasury Police, National Guard, and National Police were abolished, and military intelligence functions were transferred to civilian control. By 1993—nine months ahead of schedule—the military had cut personnel from a war-time high of 63,000 to the level of 32,000 required by the peace accords.

By 1999, ESAF strength stood at less than 15,000, including uniformed and non-uniformed personnel, consisting of personnel in the army, navy, and air force. A purge of military officers accused of human rights abuses and corruption was completed in 1993 in compliance with the Ad Hoc Commission's recommendations. The military's new doctrine, professionalism, and complete withdrawal from political and economic affairs leave it one of the most respected institutions in El Salvador.

More than 35,000 eligible beneficiaries from among the former guerrillas and soldiers who fought in the war but not all received land under the peace accord-mandated land transfer program, which ended in January 1997. The majority of them also received agricultural credits.

Post-war period (1992–present)
The FMLN participated in the 1994 presidential election as a political party; Armando Calderon Sol, the ARENA candidate, won the election.  During his rule, Calderón Sol implemented a plan of privatization of several large state enterprises and other neoliberal policies. The FMLN emerged strengthened from the legislative and municipal elections of 1997, where they won the mayoralty of San Salvador. However, internal divisions in the process of electing a presidential candidate damaged the party's image. ARENA again won the presidency in the election of March 7, 1999, with its candidate Francisco Guillermo Flores Perez.

In the presidential elections of March 21, 2004, ARENA was victorious again, this time with the candidate Elias Antonio Saca González, securing the party's third consecutive term. In the same election, economist Ana Vilma Albanez de Escobar became El Salvador's first female vice president. The election result also marked the end of the minor parties (PCN, PDC, and CD), which failed get the 3% required by electoral law to maintain their registration as parties.

Fifteen years after the Peace Accords, the democratic process in El Salvador rests on a precariously balanced system since the Legislative Assembly decreed an amnesty after the accords. As a result of this amnesty, no one responsible for crimes carried out before, during and after the war has been convicted.

In the postward period, El Salvador began to have problems with high crime "Maras" or gangs, mainly due to the deportation of Salvadorans living in the United States illegally. The two programs – La Mano Dura and Mano Superdura – created to combat crime have failed.

Currently, El Salvador's largest source of foreign currency is remittances sent by Salvadoreans abroad; these have been estimated at over $2 billion. There are over 2 million Salvadorans living abroad in countries including the United States, Canada, Mexico, Guatemala, Costa Rica, Australia, and Sweden.

In the 2009 presidential elections, FMLN candidate Carlos Mauricio Funes Cartagena, a former journalist, won the presidency. This was the first victory of a leftist party in El Salvador's history. Funes took over as President June 1, 2009, together with Salvador Sanchez Ceren as Vice President. After being charged with illicit enrichment and money laundering, Funes fled to Nicaragua where he was still living in 2019.

In 2014, Ceren took office as president,  after winning the election as the candidate of the left-wing Farabundo Martí National Liberation Front (FMLN).  Ceren had been a guerrilla leader in the Civil War and is the first ex-rebel to serve as president. Under his leadership, in April 2017, El Salvador became the first country in the world to forbid the mining of metal on its territory, for environmental and public health reasons.

Corrupted presidents 

In October 2017, an El Salvador court ruled that former leftist President Mauricio Funes, in office since 2009 until 2014, and one of his sons, had illegally enriched themselves. Funes had sought asylum in Nicaragua in 2016. 
In September 2018, former conservative President Antonio “Tony” Saca, in office since 2004 until 2009, was sentenced to 10 years in prison after he pleaded guilty to diverting more than US$300 million in state funds to his own businesses and third parties.

Nayib Bukele 2019- 

In February, 2019, Nayib Bukele, a Millennial who was not aligned with either of the major parties who had dominated the country since the Civil War,  was elected president of El Salvador.

According to a report by the International Crisis Group (ICG) 2020, the homicide rates, murders in El Salvador had dropped by as much as 60 percent since Bukele became president in June 2019. The reason might have been “non-aggression deal” between parts of the government and the gangs.

President Nayib Bukele was exceptionally popular among the citizens. According to a survey 96 percent of respondents said he was doing a “good” or “very good job. El Salvador's legislative elections was an important breakthrough in February 2021. The new party, founded by President Bukele, Nuevas Ideas, or New Ideas, won around two-thirds of votes with its allies (GANA-New Ideas). His party won supermajority 56 seats in the 84-seat parliament. The supermajority enables President Bukele to appoint judges and pass laws, for instance to remove presidential term limits. In September 2021, El Salvador's Supreme Court decided to allow Bukele to run for a second term in 2024, despite the constitution prohibits the president to serve two consecutive terms in office. The decision was organized by judges appointed to the court by President Bukele.

In January 2022, The International Monetary Fund (IMF) urged El Salvador to reverse its decision to make cryptocurrency Bitcoin legal tender. Bitcoin had rapidly lost about half of its value, meaning economic difficulties for El Salvador. President Bukele had announced his plans to build a Bitcoin city at the base of a volcano in El Salvador.

In 2022, Salvadorian government initiated a massive fight against criminal gangs and gang-related violence. State of emergency was declared on 27 March. It was extended on 20 July. More than 53,000 suspected gang members were arrested.  This has resulted in significant declines in homicide, extortion, and other gang-related crimes.

See also 

List of presidents of El Salvador
Politics of El Salvador

General:
History of the Americas
History of Central America
History of Latin America
History of North America
Spanish colonization of the Americas

References

Further reading 

 Anderson, Thomas P., Matanza ; El Salvador's communist revolt of 1932, Lincoln: Univ. of Nebraska Pr., 1971
 Grenier, Yvon, The Emergence of Insurgency in El Salvador: Ideology and Political Will, University of Pittsburgh Press 1999
 Hammond, John L., Fighting to Learn: Popular Education and Guerrilla War in El Salvador, Rutgers University Press 1998
 
 Lauria-Santiago (Herausgeber), Aldo, Leigh Binford (Herausgeber), Landscapes of Struggle: Politics, Society, and Community in El Salvador, University of Pittsburgh Press 2004.
 Lindo-Fuentes, Héctor. Weak Foundations: The Economy of El Salvador in the Nineteenth Century, 1821–1898. Berkeley and Los Angeles: University of California Press 1990.
  
 Shayne, Julie D. The Revolution Question: Feminisms in El Salvador, Chile, and Cuba, Rutgers University Press 2004
 Stanley, William, The Protection Racket State: Elite Politics, Military Extortion, and Civil War in El Salvador, Temple University Press 1996
 Tilley, Virginia Q., Seeing Indians: A Study of Race, Nation, and Power in El Salvador, University of New Mexico Press 2005
 Wood (Herausgeber), Elisabeth J., Peter Lange (Herausgeber), Robert H. Bates (Herausgeber), Insurgent Collective Action and Civil War in El Salvador, Cambridge University Press 2003
 Woodward, Ralph Lee. El Salvador. Oxford, England ; Santa Barbara, Calif. : Clio Press, c1988.

External links
Spanish Colonization
 El Salvador Early Inhabitants